An annular solar eclipse occurred on December 14, 2001. A solar eclipse occurs when the Moon passes between Earth and the Sun, thereby totally or partly obscuring the image of the Sun for a viewer on Earth. An annular solar eclipse occurs when the Moon's apparent diameter is smaller than the Sun's, blocking most of the Sun's light and causing the Sun to look like an annulus (ring). An annular eclipse appears as a partial eclipse over a region of the Earth thousands of kilometres wide.
It was visible across the Pacific ocean, southern Costa Rica, northern Nicaragua and San Andrés Island, Colombia. The central shadow passed just south of Hawaii in early morning and ended over Central America near sunset. This is the first solar eclipse to occur since the September 11, 2001 attacks.

The moon's apparent diameter was near the average diameter because the eclipse occurred 7.9 days after perigee (December 6, 2001 at 22:49 UTC) and 6.7 days before apogee (December 21, 2001 at 13:03 UTC).

Images

Gallery

Related eclipses

Eclipses of 2001 
 A total lunar eclipse on January 9.
 A total solar eclipse on June 21.
 A partial lunar eclipse on July 5.
 An annular solar eclipse on December 14.
 A penumbral lunar eclipse on December 30.

Tzolkinex 
 Preceded: Solar eclipse of November 3, 1994

 Followed: Solar eclipse of January 26, 2009

Half-Saros 
 Preceded: Lunar eclipse of December 9, 1992

 Followed: Lunar eclipse of December 21, 2010

Tritos 
 Preceded: Solar eclipse of January 15, 1991

 Followed: Solar eclipse of November 13, 2012

Solar Saros 132 
 Preceded: Solar eclipse of December 4, 1983

 Followed: Solar eclipse of December 26, 2019

Inex 
 Preceded: Solar eclipse of January 4, 1973

 Followed: Solar eclipse of November 25, 2030

Solar eclipses 2000–2003

Saros 132

Tritos series

Metonic cycle

Notes

References
NASA Press release: Annular Solar Eclipse of 2001 December 14

Photos:
 Photos of solar eclipse around the world
 
 Partial Solar Eclipse from the USA
 SpaceWeather.com Dec 14, 2001, Solar Eclipse Gallery and 

2001 12 14
2001 in science
2001 12 14
December 2001 events